Myrthe Schoot (born 29 August 1988) is a Dutch volleyball player, who plays as a libero. She is a member of the Women's National Team and competed at the 2016 Summer Olympics in Rio de Janeiro.

Career
In June 2009, Myrthe Schoot made her debut in the national team in the match against Japan at the Montreux Volley Masters.
She participated in the 2016 FIVB World Grand Prix, 2017 FIVB World Grand Prix. and 2018 FIVB Volleyball Women's Nations League.
She plays for Dresdner SC.

References

External links
FIVB profile

1988 births
Living people
Dutch women's volleyball players
Dutch expatriate sportspeople in Germany
People from Winterswijk
Sportspeople from Gelderland
Expatriate volleyball players in Germany
European Games competitors for the Netherlands
Volleyball players at the 2015 European Games
Volleyball players at the 2016 Summer Olympics
Liberos
Olympic volleyball players of the Netherlands
21st-century Dutch women